Sonja Jeannine is a retired Austrian stage and film actress.

Career
Jeannine started her career with the ensemble Löwinger-Bühne and later passed to cinema, especially acting in sex report films directed by Ernst Hofbauer, such as three Schulmädchen-Report films as well as  Schlüsselloch-Report (hotel sexuality report) and Frühreifen-Report (adolescent sexuality report). During 1976 and 1977, she was active in Italian exploitation cinema but returned to Viennese theatres with Erich Padalewski by 1978. By the early 1980s, she was performing at Theater in der Josefstadt and during this period, she met entrepreneur Richard Lugner in 1983 with whom she got engaged. Jeannine's last acting performance was in the play Der Schwierige at the Bregenz Festival the same year.

Personal life
Sonja Jeannine left Austria and settled in the USA.

Selected filmography
The Countess Died of Laughter (1973)
Virgins of the Seven Seas (1974)
The Net (1975)
La figliastra (1976)
The Black Corsair (1977)
Mannaja (1977)
 Breakthrough (1979)

References

External links

Living people
1956 births
Austrian film actresses
Austrian stage actresses
Austrian emigrants to the United States